A chatter mark is  one  or, more commonly, a series of wedge shaped marks left by chipping of a bedrock surface by rock fragments carried in the base of a glacier (glacial plucking).  Marks tend to be crescent-shaped and oriented at right angles to the direction of ice movement.

There are three different types of chatter marks. The crescentic gouge is an upstream concave that is made by the removal of a piece of rock. The crescentic fracture which is a downstream concave that is also made by the removal of rock. The lunate fracture is also a downstream concave made without the removal of rock.

See also
Glacial polish
Glacial striation

References 

Glaciology